Hope Portocarrero, also known as Madame Somoza and Hope Somoza Baldocchi later in life, (June 28, 1929 – 5 October 1991) was the wife of dictator and president of Nicaragua Anastasio Somoza Debayle and, beginning in 1967, First Lady of Nicaragua for a time. In 1968 she was named to the International Best Dressed List. She was the mother of Anastasio Somoza Portocarrero and four other children.

Early life
Born in 1929 in Tampa, Florida, Hope Portocarrero was the daughter of Dr. Nestor Portocarrero Gross and Blanca DeBayle Sacasa de Portocarrero. She had one brother, Nestor.

She was of Spanish, French and Nicaraguan descent. Her grandfather was Dr. Louis Henri DeBayle Pallais, and married to Casimira Sacasa Sacasa. He was a good friend of Rubén Darío. Her maternal great-grandfather was Roberto Sacasa Sarria, former President of Nicaragua. The DeBayles and Portocarreros were among Nicaragua's wealthiest families.

She spoke fluent English, Italian, Spanish, and French and had an appreciation for art and culture. After 1943, she moved to Washington, D.C., where she often spent time with her cousin Lillian Sevilla-Sacasa (née Somoza). She attended Barnard College of Columbia University and was in the class of 1950. Portocarrero  spent the summer of 1949 traveling in Europe accompanied by her mother.

Marriage
Portocarrero and her cousin Anastasio Somoza Debayle were married on 10 December 1950 in Managua's Cathedral by Archbishop José Antonio Lezcano. Over 4,000 guests attended the ceremony. The reception was given by her father-in-law, President Anastasio Somoza García, in the luxurious and modern Palacio de Comunicaciones. The couple traveled to South America for their honeymoon.

The Somozas had five children: Anastasio, Julio, Carolina, Carla, and Roberto Somoza Portocarrero. Her daughter, Carolina, is married to James Minskoff Sterling, son of New York real estate developer Henry H. Minskoff and his wife.

First Lady of Nicaragua
When her husband became president of Nicaragua in 1967, Portocarrero became the First Lady. She was covered in the media for her fashionable wardrobe. During her husband's time in office, she served as a hostess for many state visits, among them U.S. President Richard Nixon and Japanese Emperor Hirohito.

She created the National Cultural Center, the General Archives of the National Library, National Conservatory of Music, National School of Fine Arts (Bellas Artes), National Museum, and Plurar Gallery. Her biggest legacies were the construction of Teatro Nacional Rubén Darío (The National Theater of Nicaragua), the Children's Hospital, a clinic for Nicaraguan women, and a Center for Orphans, known as "The Hope".

Final years
Due to continuing marital strife, her husband Anastasio began a relationship with a mistress, Dinorah Sampson. Portocarrero later relocated to London. Since the couple were Catholic, she never divorced Somoza. A year after he died, she married Archie Baldocchi, a wealthy American businessman. She died of cancer in Miami, Florida on 5 October 1991.

References

SOMOZA'S SON MARRIES; 4,000 See Wedding in Managua to Hope Portocarrero of Miami The New York Times
Primeras damas: poder y apariencia El Nuevo Diario
Bracing for the Aftershocks Time magazine

External links
 The Somoza Dynasty
 Somoza Debayle
 Anastasio and Hope

Further reading
 Death of Somoza by Claribel Alegria and Darwin J. Flakoll
 La saga de los Somoza by Agustin Torres Lazo
 Somoza Falling by Anthony Lake

1929 births
1991 deaths
Somoza family
American people of French descent
American people of German descent
American people of Nicaraguan descent
American Roman Catholics
American socialites
Socialites
American emigrants to Nicaragua
First ladies of Nicaragua
People from Tampa, Florida
Barnard College alumni